Octonauts: Above & Beyond is a children's streaming television series that is the successor and spin-off of Octonauts. Produced by Mainframe Studios and Silvergate Media for Netflix, the spin-off series premiered on September 7, 2021. The series follows a similar structure to the original Octonauts series, but is primarily focused on terrestrial creatures and habitats.

A second season made a debut on May 2, 2022.

Characters
The Octonauts, consisting of the Octopod crew and captain, are the recurring main characters.

Original main characters
These are the Octonauts that were in the original series, including the captain. They are unchanged in Above & Beyond. With the exception of the Vegimals, who all gain new voice actors. Everyone’s previous actors from the original series reprise their roles here.

New main characters
These are the new characters that were added to the Octonauts crew in the series Above & Beyond. 

Other Octo-Agents include Calico Jack, Kwazii's grandfather, and Pete, his parrot sidekick; Ranger Marsh, Tweak's father; Pearl and Periwinkle, a mother-and-son pair and Shellington's older sister and nephew, respectively; Ryla the wombat, an old friend of Dashi's and a spelunker; Tracker, Barnacles' former protégé, and a polar scout radio operator; Professor Natquik the arctic fox, Barnacles' former teacher; Min, a red panda whose an old friend of Inkling; and Junior Octo-Agents Pinto and Koshi, Peso's younger brother and Dashi's younger sister respectively.

Other creatures that were introduced in the original series also make appearances in the series, with some even getting their own episodes. So far the only ones to do so, are The Invasive Species (With the exception of the Burmese Python) Spiny Sue the catfish, and Ronnie, Donnie and Lonnie the Monitor Lizards, from The Great Swamp Search, who all appear in The Monitor Lizards, and Phil the baby flamingo in The Nine Banded Armadillo.

Phil’s mother Flo, also appears in the same episode as Phil does, however off-screen.

Episodes

Season 1 (2021)

Season 2 (2022)

Release
Octonauts: Above & Beyond debuted on September 7, 2021, on Netflix. A trailer was released on August 10, 2021.

A second season was released May 2, 2022 on Netflix. The special double episode in this season is "The Octonauts and the Rainforest Rescue", which will focus on a rescuing a baby eaglet. Fisher Price will also release an Above & Beyond toy line to sell alongside the existing main series toys.

According to the producers at Silvergate Media, attempts are being made to have Above & Beyond return to public television airings.

References

External links
  at Netflix
 

2020s British animated television series
2020s British children's television series
2021 British television series debuts
2020s Canadian animated television series
2020s Canadian children's television series
2021 Canadian television series debuts
2020s preschool education television series
Animated preschool education television series
British children's animated action television series
British children's animated adventure television series
British computer-animated television series
British preschool education television series
British television spin-offs
British television shows based on children's books
Canadian children's animated action television series
Canadian children's animated adventure television series
Canadian computer-animated television series
Canadian preschool education television series
Canadian animated television spin-offs
Canadian television shows based on children's books
English-language Netflix original programming
Nature educational television series
Netflix children's programming
Television series by Sony Pictures Television